Mark Edmondson (born 28 June 1954 in Gosford, New South Wales) is a retired Australian professional tennis player.

Edmondson won the 1976 Australian Open while ranked 212th in the world, and remains the lowest-ranked winner of a Grand Slam tournament since the ATP rankings were introduced in 1973. He is the last Australian to date to win the men's singles at the Australian Open.

Edmondson's best subsequent performance in Grand Slams was reaching the semifinals of the Australian Open in 1981 and Wimbledon in 1982, which took him to a career-high singles ranking of #15. As a doubles player, he won 34 titles, including five in Grand Slams.

Grand Slam performance

Grand Slam singles performance timeline

Grand Slam finals, 10 (6 wins, 4 losses)

Singles, 1 (1 win)

Doubles, 7 (5 wins, 2 losses)

Mixed Doubles 2 (2 losses)

Career finals

Singles (6 titles, 6 runner-ups)

Doubles (34 titles, 34 runner-ups)

References

External links 
 
 
 

Australian male tennis players
Australian Open (tennis) champions
French Open champions
People from Gosford
Tennis people from New South Wales
1954 births
Living people
Grand Slam (tennis) champions in men's singles
Grand Slam (tennis) champions in men's doubles